The Sweet Escape is a 2006 album by Gwen Stefani.

Sweet Escape or The Sweet Escape may also refer to:

 "The Sweet Escape" (song), title song from above album by Gwen Stefani featuring Akon
 The Sweet Escape Tour, a concert tour by Gwen Stefani
 The Sweet Escape (film), a 2015 French comedy film
 "Sweet Escape", a song by Alesso